Miss Grand Myanmar is an annual female national beauty pageant of Myanmar, founded in 2016 by Yangon-based event organizer Style Plus H. Previously, from 2013 to 2014, the license belonged to the Miss Golden Land Myanmar organization, and then it was under the proprietary of the Miss Universe Myanmar organizer, Hello Madam, during 2017 – 2020. Since 2021, the Glamorous International, headed by a Burmese overseas in Thailand, Htoo Ant Lwin, has been responsible for sending Myanmar delegates to compete at Miss Grand International.

Since its first participation in 2013, Myanmar has never won the Miss Grand International but holds a record of 3 placements in such, including the top 20 finalists in 2013, 2020, and 2021, obtained by Htar Htet Htet, Han Lay, and Amara Shune Lei, respectively.

The reigning Miss Grand Myanmar is Ni Ni Lin Eain of Mudon who was crowned on 23 November 2022 at the Ibis Style Hotel in Mandalay.

History

Background 
Since the establishment of Miss Grand International in 2013, Myanmar has always sent its representatives to compete at such every year. However, its first three candidates from 2013 to 2015 were either handpicked or determined through the "Miss Golden Land Myanmar" pageant. Later in 2016, the first competition of Miss Grand Myanmar was conducted after the Yangon-based event organizer Style Plus H had obtained the license, the contest was held at City Hall of Pyin Oo Lwin, featuring 24 national finalists, of which, Nandar Lwin from Yangon was named the winner and no contest was additionally held since then, the license was transferred to different organizers.

During 2017 – 2020, Miss Universe Myanmar Organization was responsible for selecting the representatives of Myanmar for Miss Grand international pageants. At that time, the 1st Runner-Up of Miss Universe Myanmar represented the country in Miss Grand International. Since 2021, the Glamorous International, chaired by Htoo Ant Lwin, has been responsible for selecting and sending Myanmar representatives to the international stage.

Contestant 
Selection of contestants

Notable contestants

Edition
The following list is the edition detail of the Miss Grand Myanmar contest, since its inception in 2016.

Titleholders

Designated representatives; 2013 – 2015, 2017 – 2023

Miss Grand Myanmar Pageant

Winner Gallery

City by number of wins

International competition 

Color keys

Miss Grand International

National finalists
The following list is the national finalists of the Miss Grand Myanmar pageant, as well as the competition results.
Color keys
 Declared as the winner
 Ended as a runner-up 
 Ended as a semifinalist 
 Ended as a quarterfinalist 
 Withdrew
 Did not participate

2024: city representatives

Did not compete
 Myingyan – Nhaine Ma Mhe not competing due to her personal injury.

2016: No city title

Trivia

National Directors
 Wai Yan Aung (2013–2014)
 Hla Nu Htun (2015–2016)
 Soe Yu Wai (2017–2020)
 Htoo Ant Lwin (2021–present)

Franchise Holders
 Miss Golden Land Myanmar Organization (2013–2014)
 Style Plus H Organization (2015–2016)
 Hello Madam Media Group Co.,Ltd. (2017–2020)
 Glamorous International (2020–present)

See also 
 Miss Burma (1947–1962)
 Miss Universe Myanmar
 Miss International Myanmar
 Miss Earth Myanmar
 Miss Supranational Myanmar
 Mister Myanmar

References

External links

 

Miss Grand Myanmar
Burmese awards
Beauty pageants in Myanmar
Myanmar